The 45th Filmfare Awards South ceremony honouring the winners and nominees of the best of South Indian cinema films released 1997, is an event that was held at the Mammoth Kamraj Hall, Madras 13 June 1998.The awards were distributed at Madras.

Main awards

Kannada cinema

Malayalam cinema

Tamil cinema

Telugu cinema

Technical Awards

Special awards

Awards Presentation
 Brinda (Best Choreography) Received Award from Khushbu
 Mano (Best Playback Singer) Received Award from K. T. Kunjumon
 Simran (Best Debut) Received Award from Nagma
 B Jayshree Devi (Best Film Kannada) Received Award from Priyadarshan
 Sibi Malayil Receives N. Krishnakumar Award (Best Film Malayalam) from G Venkateswaran
 V Doraiswamy Raju (Best Film Telugu) Received Award from Balu Mahendra
 P Henry (Best Film Tamil) Received Award from Suresh Krishna
 T. S. Nagabharana (Best Director Kannada) Received Award from R B Chowdhry
 Jayaraj (Best Director Malayalam) Received Award from Parthiban
 K S Prakash Receives Raghavendra Rao Award (Best Director Telugu) from Suriya
 Cheran (Best Director Tamil) Received Award from Prabhu
 Deva (Best Music Director Kannada) Received Award from Gemini Ganeshan
 Kaithapram Damodaran Namboothiri (Best Music Director Malayalam) Received Award from Prashanth
 Vandemataram Srinivas (Best Music Director Telugu) Received Award from Vineeth
 A. R. Rahman (Best Music Director Tamil) Received Award from K. Balachander
 Vijayalakshmi (Best Actress Kannada) Received Award from Shilpa Shetty
 Manju Warrier (Best Actress Malayalam) Received Award from Sonali Bendre
 Preity Zinta Receives Vijayashanti's Award (Best Actress Telugu) from Prabhu Deva
 Meena's Father Receives her award (Best Actress Tamil) from Jaya Prada
 Ramesh Aravind (Best Actor Kannada) Received Award from Boney Kapoor
 Dulquer Salman receives Mammootty's Award (Best Actor Malayalam) from Sridevi
 Nagarjuna (Best Actor Telugu) Received Award from Tabu and Akshay Kumar
 R. Sarathkumar (Best Actor Tamil) Received Award from Rekha and Karishma Kapoor

References

External links
 
 

Filmfare Awards South